The Draft Horse is a Warner Bros. Merrie Melodies cartoon directed by Chuck Jones. The short was released on May 9, 1942.

The title is a pun on draft horse and the draft (conscription).

Plot
A farm horse sees a poster that says the U.S. Army needs horses. The horse goes to the recruiting station and tries to volunteer, but is eventually rejected, labeled "44-F". Leaving the station dejected, he wanders into a wargames situation, and the flying bullets frighten him so much he makes a dash for home. At the end, he is serving the war effort in another way, knitting "V for Victory" sweaters for the boys overseas.

Music cues
The short uses multiple music cues for several scenes. This includes:
"We Did It Before (and We Can Do It Again)" - Played during the opening credits and at the end. Also played when the sergeant looks down the horse's throat
"Here We Go Round the Mulberry Bush" - Sung by Horse as "This Is the Way We Plow the Field".
"Light Cavalry Overture" - Played when the horse sees the army billboard.
"Columbia, the Gem of the Ocean" - Played when the horse kisses the farmer goodbye.
"William Tell Overture" - Played when the horse runs off to enlist. Also played during the sham battle. Also played when the horse races home.
"Battle Music No. 9" - Played when the horse play-acts battle scenes in the recruiting office. Played again when the horse play-acts battle scenes a second time.
"Taps" - Hummed by the horse, causing the sergeant to cry.
"It Had to Be You" - Played when the horse performs the striptease.
"The Old Grey Mare" - Played when the horse removes his harness and gets brushed.
"You're in the Army Now" - Played during the eye test.

See also
 Horses in warfare
 Looney Tunes and Merrie Melodies filmography (1940–1949)

References

The EU Dubbed Print Uses 1937-1938 MWRA Over Dubbed Ending Card While The USA Dubbed Print Uses 1938-1941 MWRA

External links
 

1942 films
1942 animated films
Merrie Melodies short films
Warner Bros. Cartoons animated short films
Short films directed by Chuck Jones
Animated films about horses
American World War II propaganda shorts
American black-and-white films
Films scored by Carl Stalling
1940s Warner Bros. animated short films